Ali Raymi (born Ali Ibrahim Ali Al-Raimi; ; 7 December 1973 – 23 May 2015) was a Yemeni colonel and professional boxer. In boxing he is best known for his fight record of 25 wins and no losses, with all 25 wins by knockout; 22 in the first round.

Raymi lived in Mecca prior to 1991. He died in an explosion, possibly an airstrike on the Republican Guard positions in Al-Nahdeen district, on 23 May 2015 in Sana'a, aged 41.

Personal life
Raymi won a gold medal in Algeria for the Yemeni military, representing the amateur boxing team, his purported amateur record was 117–2, all by way of knockout, although there is no proof of this record. Stories of Raymi's life including his military career were released by his manager Felix J Arno in an interview with The Ring magazine managing editor Brian Harty.

Boxing career
Yemeni News archives show Raymi started boxing at the age of 30 representing the Yemeni military, compiling an amateur record of 117-2, winning all 117 by KO which many believe to be embellished. He was a Yemeni amateur champion in 2004, 2005, 2006 and 2007. It was during this time that Raymi started breaking Yemeni cultural norms by challenging foreign fighters, and participating in private unsanctioned fights for the next three years. Raymi grew to have a reputation in Sana'a as a loose cannon.

On 11 November 2013, he set a new world record by winning his first 20 professional fights by first-round knockout.

Prince Maz 2014 tetralogy
Prince Maz was the first fighter  to extend Ali Raymi outside the first round, repeating the feat in three out of four encounters 
 RTD1, 2014-07-17
 TKO7, 2014-08-30
 RTD9, 2014-10-16
 TKO2, 2014-11-19

Death
Raymi a Colonel in the Yemeni Anti-Terrorism forces was killed in an explosion in 23 May 2015.

Postmortem ranking
In December 2013, Raymi was ranked in the top ten by two major boxing sanctioning bodies: seventh by the WBO and ninth by the WBC. Additionally, the IBO had ranked him number one in August 2014, while the WBO improved his ranking to sixth in January 2015, as did the WBA in May 2015. Raymi also offered $100,000 to then-WBA and IBO strawweight champion Hekkie Budler for a fight in Yemen. The WBA ranked Raymi as #6 light flyweight in April 2015  and only dropped him five ranking spots to eleventh place when he died. 

Dan Rafael, senior boxing writer at ESPN, criticized the organization for the "utterly and absolutely indefensible" ranking situation. He explained, commenting that Raymi's record was "hollow... considering he fought absolutely nobody of remote recognition or accomplishment as he fashioned that glittering but meaningless mark..."

Professional boxing record

References

1973 births
Mini-flyweight boxers
Light-flyweight boxers
Flyweight boxers
Yemeni male boxers
Yemeni military officers
2015 deaths
Deaths by airstrike
Yemeni military personnel killed in the Yemeni Civil War (2014–present)
Sportspeople from Mecca